The 2021–22 FIS Alpine Ski Nor-Am Cup is the upcoming, fifty-first consecutive Nor-Am Cup season, the second international level competition in alpine skiing.

Men

Calendar

Rankings

Overall

Downhill

Super-G

Giant slalom

Slalom

Parallel giant slalom

Alpine combined

Women

Calendar

Rankings

Overall

Downhill

Super-G

Giant slalom

Slalom

Parallel giant slalom

Alpine combined

References 

2021 in alpine skiing
2022 in alpine skiing